Mária Telkes (December 12, 1900 – December 2, 1995) was a Hungarian-American biophysicist and inventor who worked on solar energy technologies.

She moved to the United States in 1925 to work as a biophysicist. She became an American citizen in 1937 and started work at the Massachusetts Institute of Technology to create practical uses of solar energy in 1939.

During World War II, she developed a solar distillation device, deployed at the end of the war, which saved the lives of downed airmen and torpedoed sailors. Her goal was to create a version for villagers in poor and arid regions.
Telkes, often called by colleagues The Sun Queen, is considered one of the founders of solar thermal storage systems. After the war, she became an associate research professor at MIT.

In the 1940s she and architect Eleanor Raymond created one of the first solar-heated houses, Dover Sun House, by storing energy each day. In 1953 they created a solar oven for people at various latitudes that could be used by children.

In 1952, Telkes became the first recipient of the Society of Women Engineers Achievement Award. She was awarded a lifetime achievement award from the National Academy of Sciences Building Research Advisory Board in 1977. Telkes registered more than 20 patents.

Early life and education
Telkes was born in Budapest, Hungary, in 1900 to Aladar and Mária Laban de Telkes, she attended elementary and high school in Budapest. Her grandfather Simon Telkes was from a Jewish family. She then studied at the Eötvös Loránd University, graduating with a B.A. in physical chemistry in 1920 and a PhD in 1924.

Career
When Telkes moved to the United States in 1924, she visited a relative who was the Hungarian consul in Cleveland, Ohio. There, she was hired to work at the Cleveland Clinic Foundation to investigate the energy produced by living organisms. Telkes did some research while working at the foundation, and under the leadership of George Washington Crile, they invented a photoelectric mechanism that could record brain waves. They also worked together to write a book called Phenomenon of Life.

Telkes next worked as a physicist at Westinghouse. She developed metal alloys for thermocouples to convert heat into electricity.

She wrote to Massachusetts Institute of Technology (MIT) about working in its new solar energy program. She was hired in 1939, staying until 1953.

Desalination 
During World War II, the United States government, noting Telkes's expertise, recruited her to serve as a civilian advisor to the Office of Scientific Research and Development (OSRD). There, she developed a solar-powered water desalination machine, completing a prototype in 1942. It came to be one of her most notable inventions because it helped soldiers get clean water in difficult situations and also helped solve water problems in the US Virgin Islands. However, its initial deployment was delayed until the end of the war because Hoyt C. Hottel repeatedly re-negotiated its manufacturing contracts.

Telkes identified solar heat storage as the most "critical problem" facing designers of a workable solar-heated house. One of her specialties was phase-change materials that absorb or release heat when they change from solid to liquid. She hoped to use phase-change materials like molten salts for storing thermal energy in active heating systems. One of her materials of choice was Glauber's salt (sodium sulfate).

Hottel, as chairman of the solar energy fund at MIT, originally supported Telkes's approach. He wrote that "Dr. Telkes’ contribution may make a big difference in the outcome of our project". However, he was both less interested in and more skeptical about solar power, compared to Telkes. Telkes, like the project's funder Godfrey Lowell Cabot, was a "fervent believer in solar energy". There were personality clashes between Hottel and Telkes.

In 1946, the group tried to use Glauber’s salt in the design of their second solar house. Hottel and others blamed Telkes for problems with the material. In spite of support from university president Karl Compton, Telkes was reassigned to the metallurgy department, where she continued her work on thermocouples. Although she was no longer involved in the MIT solar fund, Cabot would have liked her to return. He encouraged her to continue working on the problem independently.

Dover Sun House 
In 1948, Telkes started working on the Dover Sun House; she teamed up with architect Eleanor Raymond, with the project financed by philanthropist and sculptor Amelia Peabody. The system was designed so that Glauber's salt would melt in the sun, trap the heat and then release it as it cooled and hardened.

The system worked with the sunlight passing through glass windows, which would heat the air inside the glass. This heated air then passed through a metal sheet into another air space. From there, fans moved the air to a storage compartment filled with the salt (sodium sulfate). These compartments were in between the walls, heating the house as the salt cooled.

For the first two years the house was successful, receiving tremendous publicity and drawing crowds of visitors. Popular Science hailed it as perhaps more important, scientifically, than the atom bomb. By the third winter, there were problems with the Glauber’s salt: it had stratified into layers of liquid and solid, and its containers were corroded and leaking. The owners removed the solar heating system from their house, replacing it with an oil furnace.

In 1953 George Russell Harrison, Dean of Science at MIT, called for a review of the solar fund at MIT, due to concerns about its lack of productivity. The resulting report tended to promote Hottel's views and disparaged both Cabot and Telkes. Telkes was fired by MIT in 1953 after the report came out.

Solar-powered oven 
As of 1953, Telkes was working at the New York University College of Engineering where she continued to conduct solar energy research.
Telkes received a grant from the Ford Foundation of $45,000 to develop a solar-powered oven so people who lack the technology around the world would be able to heat things. The two main criteria for this project were: the oven temperature must get as high as 350° Fahrenheit (175° Celsius), and it must be easy to use.

Telkes spent several years in industry. Initially, she was the director of solar energy at the Curtiss-Wright Company. Next, she worked on materials for use in extreme conditions, such as space, at Cryo-Therm (1961–1963). This work included helping to develop materials for use in the Apollo mission and Polaris missiles. Then, she worked as director of solar energy at Melpar, Inc. (1963–1969).

In 1969 Telkes joined the Institute of Energy Conversion at the University of Delaware. She began to study electricity-generating photovoltaic cells. In 1971 she helped to build the first house to generate both heat and electricity from the sun.

In 1981 she helped the US Department of Energy to develop and build the first fully solar-powered home, Carlisle House in Carlisle, Massachusetts.

In 1964 she spoke at the first International Conference of Women Engineers and Scientists in New York.

Awards and accolades 
Telkes was recognized many times for her work.

1945 – OSRD Certificate of Merit for the Desalination Unit
1952 – Inaugural Society of Women Engineers Achievement Award
1977 – Charles Greeley Abbot Award, American Solar Energy Society
2012 – Induction into the National Inventors Hall of Fame

Papers
Telkes's papers are in the collections of the Arizona State University Library, Design and the Arts Special Collections, in Tempe, Arizona.

References

External links

1900 births
1995 deaths
20th-century American chemists
20th-century American women scientists
American biophysicists
American people of Hungarian-Jewish descent
American physical chemists
Hungarian emigrants to the United States
Hungarian people of Jewish descent
Hungarian physical chemists
Hungarian women chemists
Scientists from Budapest
Scientists from Texas
Women biophysicists
Women inventors
20th-century American inventors
Hungarian biophysicists